The celatone was a device invented by Galileo Galilei to observe Jupiter's moons with the purpose of finding longitude on Earth.  It took the form of a piece of headgear with a telescope taking the place of an eyehole.

Modern versions 

In 2013, Matthew Dockrey created a replica celatone, using notes from a version created by Samuel Parlour. From April 2014 to January 2015, Dockrey's celatone was on display in the Royal Observatory, Greenwich in east London.

See also 
 Longitude prize
 Galilean moons

References

External links
 Video animation of a Celatone and its use in discovering the longitude for marine navigation
 Dockrey celatone
 "Apparatus to render a telescope manageable on shipboard"

Astronomical instruments